Toon Vandebosch (born 19 June 1999) is a Belgian cyclist, who currently rides for UCI Continental team .

Major results

Cyclo-cross

2015–2016
 Junior Soudal Classics
1st Niel
2nd Leuven
3rd Neerpelt
 2nd Junior Mol
 3rd National Junior Championships
 Junior Superprestige
3rd Middelkerke
 Junior BPost Bank Trophy
3rd Essen
 3rd Junior Oostmalle
 3rd Junior Boom
2016–2017
 1st  National Junior Championships
 1st  Overall UCI Junior World Cup
2nd Heusden-Zolder
2nd Zeven
3rd Fiuggi
 2nd Overall Junior Superprestige
1st Ruddervoorde
1st Spa-Francorchamps
1st Gavere
2nd Diegem
2nd Gieten
3rd Middelkerke
 Junior DVV Trophy
1st Loenhout
2nd Ronse
3rd Lille
 Junior Brico Cross
1st Geraardsbergen
 3rd Junior Oostmalle
2017–2018
 2nd National Under-23 Championships
 Under-23 Superprestige
2nd Zonhoven
3rd Ruddervoorde
2018–2019
 Under-23 Brico Cross
1st Lokeren
 Under-23 DVV Trophy
2nd Brussels
2019–2020
 1st  National Under-23 Championships

Road
2022
 1st Stage 1 Tour de Namur
 6th Overall Course de Solidarność et des Champions Olympiques
 7th Overall Tour d'Eure-et-Loir

References

External links

Toon Vandebosch at Cyclocross 24

1999 births
Living people
Belgian male cyclists
Cyclo-cross cyclists
People from Lier, Belgium
Cyclists from Antwerp Province